David O. Sullivan (October 23, 1923 - July 18, 2012) was an American intelligence officer who worked for the Central Intelligence Agency for 22 years. He was the recipient of the Intelligence Medal of Merit.

References

1923 births
2012 deaths
People from Alexandria, Virginia
American University alumni
People of the Central Intelligence Agency
Deaths from cancer in Virginia